B.L.A.C. Detroit magazine is operated by BLAC Inc, a Detroit, MI - based company that produces the flagship magazine BLAC, web content, events and video segments, is owned by Billy J. Strawter, Jr. a Detroit area entrepreneur. The free-of-charge publication debuted in April 1999 as African American Parent Magazine, a publication for Black parents, grandparents, educators and children. In 2002, the name was changed to African American Family. During its 10th anniversary year, the publication was renamed BLAC (an acronym for Black Life, Arts & Culture) to more accurately reflect the content and mission.

A monthly publication, B.L.A.C. Detroit is distributed at nearly 600 locations throughout the metro Detroit area with a circulation at 30,000.

Events

African American Family Magazine’s Distinguished Speaker Series
As part of African American Family Magazine’s ongoing goal to inform and motivate metro Detroiters, the publication presents notable speakers at various local area venues. Speakers have included Civil Rights activist Coretta Scott King, poet/actress Maya Angelou, Pulitzer Prize winning author Toni Morrison, Black Entertainment Television (BET) co-founder Sheila Johnson, Rwandan heroine and author of Left To Tell: Discovering God Amidst the Rwandan Holocaust Immaculee Ilibagiza, former Lost Boy of Sudan and author of God Grew Tired of Us John Bul Dau, former President Bill Clinton, and multi-millionaire entrepreneur and author of The Pursuit of Happyness Christopher Gardner. The events are co-sponsored by local corporations and partial proceeds benefit specific charities.

Awards
African American Family has received several awards for the publication’s editorial content and design. Honors have included The National Association of Black Journalists (NABJ) “Salute to Excellence Award”, Parenting Publications of America (PPA) - (Gold, Silver and Bronze Awards), Society of Professional Journalists (SPJ) Award, Life Directions - Mary Ball Children's Advocacy Award, Legacy Award  (from Aisha Shule-WEB Dubois Academy, Detroit, MI), Against All Odds “Excellence in Print Media” AWEC/Alliance.

References

African-American history of Michigan
Magazines published in Detroit
1999 establishments in Michigan
Magazines established in 1999
African-American magazines
Parenting magazines
Monthly magazines published in the United States